"Jukebox Joints" is a song by rap artist ASAP Rocky, featuring Joe Fox and Kanye West, from Rocky's second studio album At. Long. Last. ASAP (2015). The music video for it was officially released on August 10, 2015.

Critical reception
The track was described by Meaghan Garvey of Pitchfork as being 'back-to-basics' in praise, since she wrote that Rocky has: 'got real shit to say'. Billboard had praise for Fox's appearance on the song and the rest of his contributions to the album, writing that he: 'anchors almost a third of the album with sung hooks'.

Tonight Show performance
On June 11, 2015, Rocky was joined by The Roots on The Tonight Show Starring Jimmy Fallon to perform "Jukebox Joints" along with At. Long. Last. ASAP single "L$D". As Jimmy Fallon himself alluded to, it wasn't clear exactly how seriously Rocky had taken the drug-tinged lyrics of both songs before the performance, since it began with him reclining in a bed. The performance saw him rise from the bed to rap a medley of "Jukebox Joints" and "LSD".

Samples
The track contains a sample of 1972 recording "Doa untuk kekasih", performed by Rasela. It also samples 1968 track "Much Better Off" by Smokey Robinson and The Miracles, as well as 1975 song "Who Cares", performed by Tony Aiken and Future 2000.

Music video
On August 10, 2015, the music video for "Jukebox Joints" was officially released. It shows ASAP Mob relaxing in a variety of places, ranging from bedrooms to subway stations and the effects of psychedelic colors and smoke are used within the video. The version of the track used for the music video was different from the album version, since West's verse was not included in it and he didn't appear in the video either.

Commercial performance
The song peaked at number 7 on the US Billboard Bubbling Under R&B/Hip-Hop Singles chart and spent a total of two weeks on it.

Charts

Certifications

References

External links

2015 songs
ASAP Rocky songs
Kanye West songs
Songs written by ASAP Rocky
Songs written by Kanye West
Song recordings produced by Kanye West